Shenbei New Area is a development zone and one of ten districts of the prefecture-level city of Shenyang, the capital of Liaoning Province, Northeast China, and forms part of the northern suburbs. It borders Dongling District to the southeast, Dadong District and Huanggu District to the south, Yuhong District to the southwest, Xinmin City and Faku County to the northwest; it also borders the prefecture-level cities of Tieling to the northeast and Fushun to the southeast.

References

www.xzqh.org

External links 

County-level divisions of Liaoning
Shenyang